Adam and Eve is a 1949 Italian comedy film directed by Mario Mattoli and starring Erminio Macario.

Cast
 Erminio Macario as Adamo Rossi (as Macario)
 Isa Barzizza as Eva Bianchi
 Gianni Agus as Paride
 Guglielmo Barnabò as Joe
 Nerio Bernardi as Agamennone
 Riccardo Billi as Abu Hassan, l'eunuco
 Luigi Cimara as Ulisse
 Ricky Denver as Fatima (as Riki Denver)
 Grado De Franceschi as Il giocoliere cristiano
 Nunzio Filogamo as Il naufrago francese
 Giulio Marchetti as Il naufrago americano
 Guido Barbarisi as Il naufrago ebreo
 Mario Riva as Il naufrago russo

References

External links

1949 films
1949 comedy films
Italian comedy films
1940s Italian-language films
Italian black-and-white films
Films directed by Mario Mattoli
1940s Italian films